"Let Your Conscience Be Your Guide" is the debuting single for singer Marvin Gaye, released as Tamla 54041, in May 1961. It was also the first release off Gaye's debut album, The Soulful Moods of Marvin Gaye, in which most of the material was the singer's failed attempt at making an 'adult' record compared to Motown's younger R&B sound.

Overview

Background
In 1960, Marvin Gaye moved to Detroit with his mentor Harvey Fuqua, who had first booked him as a co-lead singer of "Harvey & the Moonglows", a splinter version of the popular fifties doo-wop group, the Moonglows. Fuqua and Gaye met up with several members of the Gordy family, and before long both of them were dating the female Gordy members Gwen and Anna respectively. Around that fall, Marvin was introduced to Motown Records CEO Berry Gordy after Gaye walked in during a party at the local Hitsville studios and played around on the piano. Gordy later signed Gaye first as a session drummer for Anna Records and eventually signed him into Motown's Tamla label as an artist. After several arguments over the direction of the album - the headstrong Marvin wanted to record a "Frank Sinatra-styled pop album" while Gordy wanted him to record R&B, the two came to a compromise, while most of Soulful Moods featured covers of jazz songs and Broadway tunes, three of the final songs on the album were produced in a rhythm and blues mode.

Song style
This song was inspired by a Ray Charles ballad and featured background vocals by The Andantes. During the song Marvin mixes a smooth tenor with a few falsetto whoops.

Release
Gordy released it with the b-side being the Anna Gordy and Harvey Fuqua-penned "Never Let You Go (Sha-Lu Bop)" in May 1961, a month after Marvin's 22nd birthday. Before its release, however, Marvin sought to begin his solo career with a new name. Inspired by Sam Cooke, Marvin added an "e" to his last name therefore becoming forever known as Marvin Gaye. Despite regional success in Detroit, the song failed to enter either the pop or R&B chart on the national Billboard magazine. Mary Wells later covered the song for her own debut Motown release, Bye Bye Baby I Don't Want to Take a Chance.

Credits
Lead vocals by Marvin Gaye
Background vocals by The Andantes
Instrumentation by The Funk Brothers
Written and produced by Berry Gordy

References

1961 debut singles
Marvin Gaye songs
Songs written by Berry Gordy
1961 songs
Tamla Records singles